New Faces was a British talent show, broadcast from 1973 and 1988.

New Faces can also refer to:

 New Faces (Australian TV series), the Australian version of said show
 New Faces (band), an American band
 New Faces of 1952, a musical revue
 New Faces (film), a 1954 American film based on the musical revue and directed by Harry Horner and John Beal
 New Faces (album), a 1985 album by trumpeter Dizzy Gillespie